Tigra Dam (also spelled "Tig Dam") creates a freshwater reservoir on the Sank River, about 23 km from Gwalior, Madhya Pradesh, India It plays a crucial role in supplying water to the city and is an important tourism spot of Gwalior.

The dam is 24 metres high at its crest, and 1341 m long.  The reservoir has a capacity of 4.8 million cubic metres and the spillway structure can pass up to 1274 cubic metres per second.

History
A dam constructed on this site in 1915 failed on the afternoon of 19 August 1917, due to infiltration into its sandstone foundations.  About 1000 people were killed downstream.

A subsequent structure failed in 1970

Tigra Dam has been constructed on Sank River in 1916. This dam has been constructed in the vicinity of eleven villages. The villagers depend on this dam for their irrigation, drinking and domestic purpose. Moreover, the dam also provides the water required for the drinking purpose in the Gwalior City. One of the negative impacts of Tigra dam is that it is constructed in Ghati Goan. After the construction of the dam the area became a suitable habitat for several birds and this area was declared Ghatigaon Wildlife Sanctuary in 1981. However this also led to the relocation of the people that was residing in the surrounding area of the dam. Despite the positive attributes like control of stream regime, prevention of flood, water for irrigation, dams still present negative impacts on the environment. Some of the negative impacts that can be mentioned are water logging, land loss, relocation of people and silt formation.

References

External links 

  Water Demand Management Strategies and Implementation Plan for Gwalior 
 http://travel.sulekha.com/gwalior-attractions.htm

Dam failures in Asia
Dams in Madhya Pradesh
Buildings and structures in Gwalior
Dams completed in 1916
Tourist attractions in Gwalior district
Year of establishment missing
1916 establishments in India
20th-century architecture in India
1970 disasters in India
1917 disasters in India